The Australian Aircraft Kits Hornet STOL is an Australian ultralight aircraft, designed and produced by Australian Aircraft Kits and introduced in 2004. The aircraft is supplied as a kit for amateur construction or as a complete ready-to-fly-aircraft.

Design and development
Designed for STOL operations in the Australian outback and cattle mustering, the Hornet STOL features a strut-braced high-wing, a two-seats-in-side-by-side configuration enclosed cockpit, fixed conventional landing gear and a single engine in tractor configuration.

The aircraft is made from aluminium all-metal construction. Its  span wing employs flaps and is supported by V-struts with jury struts. Standard engines available are the  Rotax 912ULS,  Rotax 914, but the  Rotec R2800 radial engine or the  Lycoming O-320 four-stroke powerplants can be fitted. Tundra tires are usually fitted for off-airport operations.

Specifications (Hornet STOL)

References

External links

2000s Australian ultralight aircraft
Homebuilt aircraft
Single-engined tractor aircraft
Australian Aircraft Kits aircraft